Coed y Brenin (Welsh for King's Forest) is a forest in the Snowdonia National Park, North Wales near Dolgellau at . It is popular for its mountain bike trails and hiking paths. It has several man-made mountain bike singletrack courses in a woodland setting, varying in length from 12 to 38 km (7 to 23 mi), and one dual slalom course.

The site is owned and operated by Natural Resources Wales, and covers an area of some 9,000 acres (36 km2) around the valleys of the rivers Mawddach, Eden, Gain and Wen. There is no charge for using the trails, but there is a charge for the car park at Coed y Brenin Visitor Centre. This costs £1 for 1 hour, £3 for 3 hours and £5 for all day parking. All of the proceeds go towards the maintenance and improvement of the forest trails.

Coed y Brenin was identified as a potential mountain bike race course in 1990, and the first races were held there in 1991. The initial course had to be chopped out of an impassable rock-strewn terrain.

Shortly afterwards a Mountain Biking hire shop, together with a visitor centre and café were opened at Maesgwm. Five waymarked trails were developed by Dafydd Davis who was employed by Forest Enterprise as a Forest Sports Development Adviser, grew Coed y Brenin into a major UK mountain biking centre. Davis received an MBE in the 2004 Queen's Birthday Honours list for 'services to forestry' relating to his work on this resort.

A new £1.6 million visitor centre opened in the summer of 2006. Since the opening of the centre, the trail offering has grown to eight mountain biking trails, eight walking trails and five running trails. These trails are way marked.

The visitor information desk is available seven days per week, throughout the year (except Christmas Day, Boxing Day and New Year's Day) during the gift shop opening hours of 10:00hrs and 16:00hrs. There are a number of picnic tables around the main car parks within Coed y Brenin Forest Park plus many more on the waymarked walking trails. Some of the picnic tables have metal frames for holding disposable barbeques. There are also stone BBQ plinths in Glasdir and Ty'n y Groes picnic sites.

Mountain bike trails 
In the late 1980s, Mark Willmore first had talks with the Forestry Commission about bringing mountain biking onto forestry commission land. Willmore ran the first trail centre at Coed-y-Brenin. Davis took up the baton the following season and has had an influential role in making the centre what it is today. Willmore and his then French business partner, Sophie Rebore that brought the French MBK brand of MTB to Wales after seeing the potential of this then fledgling sport in the French ski resorts. Currently E-Bikes or electric bikes are not allowed on the trails due to the higher wear and tear they cause.

External links
 Recreation at Coed y Brenin
 Mountain Biking in Coed y Brenin - MBWales

References

Forests and woodlands of Gwynedd
Tourist attractions in Gwynedd
Forests and woodlands of Snowdonia
Tourist attractions in Snowdonia